The Bauzi or Baudi tribe consists of a group of 2,000 people living in the north-central part of the Indonesian province of Papua (formerly Irian Jaya).  The Bauzi area consists of much of the west side of lower Mamberamo River area in northern Papua. The Bauzi people lived on hunting and gathering in the jungle. While the Bauzi people were historically an animistic people group, they are now 65% Christian.  For the most part, tribal warfare is no longer a large part of Bauzi culture and all Bauzi people speak the same language.  In recent years, linguists have been studying the language and translating various literature, including the Bible, into the Bauzi language.

See also

Indigenous people of New Guinea

References

Indigenous ethnic groups in Western New Guinea
Ethnic groups in Indonesia